HMS Leeds Castle was a  of the Royal Navy, originally with pennant number K384.

She was built by William Pickersgill & Sons Ltd. in Sunderland, launched on 12 October 1943 and completed in February 1944.

In World War II she served in the B3 Escort Group, protecting Atlantic convoys until the end of the war in 1945. She then joined the Anti-Submarine Training Squadron at the Portland, United Kingdom, and continued in this role until she was paid off at Chatham, England, United Kingdom in November 1956, after serving a total of 12 and a half years. As with other surviving Castle-class corvettes, she had been redesigned as a frigate in 1948 and her pennant number accordingly changed to F384. In 1953 she took part in the Fleet Review to celebrate the Coronation of Queen Elizabeth II.

She was scrapped in 1958.

References

Publications

 

Castle-class corvettes
1943 ships